I'm Gilda is a 2016 Argentine biographical drama film about the life of tropical singer and songwriter Gilda. It stars Natalia Oreiro in the title role.

Cast 
 Natalia Oreiro - Miriam Alejandra Bianchi/Gilda
 Ángela Torres - Teenage Gilda
 Mia Eileen Urea - 7-year-old Gilda
 Lautaro Delgado - Raúl
 Javier Drolas - Juan Carlos "Toti" Giménez
 Daniel Melingo - Omar Bianchi
 Susana Pampín - Tita Scioli
 Roly Serrano - "El Tigre" Almada
 Daniel Valenzuela - Waldo
 Diego Cremonesi - Rey

Soundtracks 

In the film Natalia Oteiro sings Paisaje written by the italian singer-songwriter Franco Simone and No me arrepiento de este amor and Corazòn herido.

See also 

 Gilda: The Series

References

External links 
 

2016 biographical drama films
Argentine biographical drama films
Biographical films about singers
Cultural depictions of pop musicians
2010s Argentine films